Noureddine Boutzamar (born 9 April 1994) is a Dutch football player who plays for SC Genemuiden. He also holds Moroccan citizenship.

Club career
He made his professional debut in the Eredivisie for SC Cambuur on 8 May 2016 in a game against S.B.V. Excelsior.

Boutzamar joined SC Genemuiden ahead of the 2019-20.

References

External links
 

1994 births
Sportspeople from Heerenveen
Dutch sportspeople of Moroccan descent
Living people
Dutch footballers
SC Cambuur players
Eredivisie players
Eerste Divisie players
Association football midfielders
Footballers from Friesland